Andi Prifti (born 1 August 1988 in Fier) is an Albanian footballer who most recently played for Apolonia Fier in the Albanian First Division. His younger brother Albi also plays for Apolonia Fier.

References

1988 births
Living people
Sportspeople from Fier
Association football defenders
Albanian footballers
KF Apolonia Fier players
KS Albpetrol Patos players
KF Çlirimi players
KF Korabi Peshkopi players
KF Bylis Ballsh players
Kategoria Superiore players
Kategoria e Parë players
Kategoria e Dytë players